"PerfektBreitHimmelblau" ("Perfect Stoned Sky-blue") are three songs and a triple A-side-single by the German rock band Die Ärzte. The songs are tracks 8, 3 and 1 of their 2007 album Jazz ist anders.

Track listings 
The track listing is different by any CD. On the back cover the songs are in this order:
 Perfekt - 2:35
 Himmelblau - 3:16
 Breit - 3:14
 PerfektHimmelblauBreit (Flash game with the music-video)

Other track listings 
 Perfekt
 Breit
 Himmelblau

 Himmelblau
 Perfekt
 Breit

 Himmelblau
 Breit
 Perfekt

 Breit
 Perfekt
 Himmelblau

 Breit
 Himmelblau
 Perfekt

Video 
The video is divided into three parts; there is a separate video for every song, but they all follow the same concept: They are set in Berlin in the year 2046, in a modern nursing home. Bela is 84, Farin 83, Rodrigo 78 years old.

The videos can already be distinguished at the beginning: In "Himmelblau" there is a turquoise jet-car, in "Breit" a dark green one, and in "Perfekt" a dark red one.
All three videos start with two doctors pushing a trolley up to a door and then entering a code. When the door opens, you see a computer with name, age and status. Instead of the actual status, there is the title of the song. Then two doctors give a medical ampoule to the performers.

"Himmelblau" stars Farin Urlaub, "Perfekt" Bela B., "Breit" Rodrigo González as old men. The two names of the doctors are "Bernd" and "Mandy".
 Bernd refers to the line: "...Doch dann kam Bernd mit dem Zeugs verbei..." (... but then came Bernd with the good stuff...) in the song "Breit" 
 Mandy refers to the line: "...Oh, Mandy. Die kleine Candy-Mandy..." (...Oh Mandy, the little candy-Mandy!...) in the song "Perfekt" 
The video premiere was on 17 November 2009 at 5.30 pm on MTV.

Flash game 
In the flash game one is able to select a musician (Farin Urlaub=light, Rodrigo González=medium, Bela B.=difficult) and with a right-click the musician attacks a doctor with his instrument (Farin with his guitar, Rod with his bass, Bela with his drum sticks). At the end you stand in front of the door to your room and the score is shown on the door.

Vinyl version 
The vinyl is a 12-inch picture disc with a built-in "random generator".

Instead of a usual single groove that spirals from the rim to the middle of the vinyl, this is a triple helix-groove, i.e. three parallel grooves, each consisting of one song. If the listener has the cartridge, he can not control what song is played.

On the B-side is the video in "still image version" which means that there is print a screenshot of the video.

Track listing 
A-side
 PerfektBreitHimmelblau (mit eingebautem Zufallsgenerator) [with built-in random generator]
B-side
 PerfektBreitHimmelblau video (Standbild-version) ["still image version"]

Other names 
Because of the front cover and the different track listings the single is called by different names:
 PerfektBreitHimmelblau
 PerfektHimmelblauBreit
 HimmelblauPerfektBreit
 BreitHimmelblauPerfekt

The video is in the order: "Perfekt", "Himmelblau", "Breit"

Personnel

Perfekt
Bela B. - vocals, drums
Farin Urlaub - guitar
Rodrigo González - bass

Breit
Rodrigo González - vocals, bass
Farin Urlaub - guitar
Bela B. - drums

Himmelblau
Farin Urlaub - vocals, guitar
Bela B. - drums
Rodrigo González - bass

Charts

References 

2009 singles
Die Ärzte songs
2007 songs
Songs written by Bela B.